
Gmina Kazimierz Dolny is an urban-rural gmina (administrative district) in Puławy County, Lublin Voivodeship, in eastern Poland.

The gmina contains part of the protected area called Kazimierz Landscape Park.

Villages
Apart from the town of Kazimierz Dolny, Gmina Kazimierz Dolny contains the villages and settlements of Bochotnica, Parchatka, Rzeczyca, Rzeczyca-Kolonia, Skowieszynek, Wierzchoniów, Witoszyn and Zbędowice.

Neighbouring gminas
Gmina Kazimierz Dolny is bordered by the town of Puławy and by the gminas of Janowiec, Karczmiska, Końskowola, Wąwolnica and Wilków.

References
Polish official population figures 2006

Kazimierz Dolny
Puławy County